Moses Boyd (born 30 April 1991) is a British jazz drummer, composer, record producer, bandleader and radio host. His debut solo studio album Dark Matter (2020) was nominated for the 2020 Mercury Prize.

In 2014, Boyd and saxophonist Binker Golding formed the duo Binker & Moses and released three consecutive albums, with accolades including one MOBO Award, two Jazz FM Awards and a Parliamentary Jazz Award. In 2022, Binker & Moses released their fourth album, Feeding the Machine, to critical acclaim.

Boyd's self-titled jazz band Moses Boyd Exodus (also known as the Exodus) released several mixtapes in the mid-2010s and together have recorded most of Boyd's solo releases. The group consists of Theon Cross (tubist), Artie Zaitz (guitarist), Binker Golding (saxophonist) and Nathaniel Cross (trombonist).

Under his own label, Exodus Records, Boyd made his solo debut with the extended play Absolute Zero in 2017, and followed it up with Displaced Diaspora in 2018. He has additionally collaborated with musicians such as Beyoncé, Little Simz, Lonnie Liston Smith, Zara McFarlane, Obongjayar, Ed Motta, Sons of Kemet, Soweto Kinch, Floating Points, Four Tet and Theon Cross.

Early life 
Boyd was born and raised in the district of Catford in south London. He describes himself as a "second-generation West Indian" with Dominican descent from his father and Jamaican descent from his mother. He attended Sedgehill School, which was where he began learning drums. Boyd claims that at one point he was taught drums by Bobby Worth. In 2016, he graduated from Trinity Laban Conservatoire of Music and Dance with a Bachelor of Music in jazz drums. While at Trinity Laban, he took part of the jazz education programme Tomorrow's Warriors.

Other ventures 
In addition to music, Boyd was a resident host throughout 2019 on BBC Radio 1Xtra. He also performed a few stints filling in for Gilles Peterson on BBC Radio 6 Music in mid 2020.

Artistry and reception

Musical style 
Boyd is popularly known for blending multiple genres into jazz to create various new sub-genres. He has been noted to perform and write in the styles of nu-jazz, and fusion, additionally incorporating elements of grime, electronica, highlife and broken beat. Boyd has described his own music as "an extension of black music, the diaspora" that draws influence from afrobeats, soca, reggae, drum and bass and jungle music.

Critical reception 
Boyd is known as a prominent figure within the modern London jazz scene. He has been described by The Guardian as "a progenitor of the current London jazz scene", and "a poster boy of the London jazz revival."

Influences 
Boyd has cited Miles Davis's Kind of Blue and Dizzee Rascal's Boy in Da Corner as major influences. Boyd is closely associated with jazz personality and DJ Gilles Peterson, whom he cites as an influence in learning how to "use jazz in club culture".

Discography

Studio albums

Collaborative albums

Extended plays 

Absolute Zero (2017)

Mixtapes 

 Footsteps Of Our Fathers  (2015)
Time and Space  (2016)

Singles

As lead artist

As featured artist

Guest appearances

Songwriting, production and performance credits 
Adapted from Discogs, Tidal, and AllMusic.

Awards and nominations

Notes

References

External links

Living people
1991 births
21st-century English composers
21st-century drummers
English jazz composers
English jazz drummers
British male jazz musicians
Alumni of Trinity Laban Conservatoire of Music and Dance
Black British musicians
BBC Radio 1Xtra presenters
English people of Dominica descent
English people of Jamaican descent
21st-century British male musicians
21st-century jazz composers
Nu jazz musicians